The Sydney–Brisbane railway corridor is a  long standard-gauge railway corridor that connects the state capitals of Brisbane (Queensland) and Sydney (New South Wales) in Australia.

Description
The corridor consists of the first  of the Main North Line from Sydney Central to Maitland, and then the entire  of the North Coast line to Roma Street, Brisbane.

The NSW TrainLink XPT passenger service operates along the route, as do a number of other freight and passenger services.

History
Originally the corridor was made up of the Queensland Rail narrow gauge Southern line and the New South Wales Government Railways standard gauge line that met at Wallangarra at a break-of-gauge in 1888. It was not until 1930 that the coastal, standard gauge North Coast line was extended from Casino to Brisbane making through services possible, using a rail ferry for the river crossing in Grafton until the Grafton Bridge opened in 1932.

The old Main Northern railway line which went to Wallangarra now terminates near Armidale.

Gallery

See also
Northern Sydney Freight Corridor – a package of capacity improvements between Sydney and Newcastle

References

Citations

Sources 

 

Rail infrastructure in Australia
Railway lines in New South Wales
Railway lines in Queensland
Standard gauge railways in Australia
Interstate rail in Australia
1930 establishments in Australia